Rengert Robert Anker  (26 April 1946 – 20 January 2017) was a Dutch writer. In 1993 he won the Ferdinand Bordewijk Prijs for his novel De terugkeer van kapitein Rob, and in 2002 the Libris Prize for Een soort Engeland.

References

1946 births
2017 deaths
20th-century Dutch novelists
20th-century Dutch poets
20th-century Dutch male writers
Dutch male poets
Ferdinand Bordewijk Prize winners
Libris Prize winners
Dutch male novelists
People from Noorder-Koggenland